Chinkapook is a locality in Victoria, Australia, located approximately 67 km from Swan Hill. It is on the Robinvale railway line, 70 km south of the terminus at Robinvale.

The Post Office opened on 12 September 1910 as Christmas Tank, was renamed Chinkapook in 1914 and closed in 1974.

Many of Australian poet John Shaw Neilson's notebooks were destroyed or severely damaged in a mouse plague at Chinkapook.  Douglas Stewart's poem "The Mice of Chinkapook" refers to this event.

Gallery

References

External links

Towns in Victoria (Australia)
Rural City of Swan Hill